Langenstein may refer to:

Langenstein, Austria, a municipality in Upper Austria, Austria
Langenstein, Saxony-Anhalt, a municipality in Saxony-Anhalt, Germany
Langenstein-Zwieberge, a WW2 concentration camp in Langenstein, Saxony-Anhalt